Australian Art Review was a quarterly magazine and website based in Sydney, featuring a mixture of exhibition reviews, artist and gallery profiles, advice for collectors and articles by art critics and scholars. It was published between 2003 and 2013,

History
The first edition of the Australian Art Review appeared in March/June 2003. The founding company was Media Publishing, based in Clontarf, New South Wales. The magazine has its headquarters in Sydney. In 2008, the magazine was purchased by Westwick-Farrow Media, and remained part of the company until August 2011. From number 29 that was published in September-October 2011 the magazine became part of the Australian Art and Leisure Media.

Australian Art Review was started as a quarterly publication, and later it was published three times per year for a short period time. The frequency was later switched quarterly.

The journal ceased publication in July 2013

References

External links
 Archived website, June 2013

2003 establishments in Australia
2013 disestablishments in Australia
Magazines established in 2003
Magazines published in Sydney
Quarterly magazines published in Australia
Visual arts magazines
Triannual magazines
Arts magazines published in Australia